"Five Little Monkeys"  is a folk song and fingerplay of American origin.  It is usually accompanied by a sequence of gestures that mimic the words of the song.  Each successive verse sequentially counts down from the starting number.

The song has similar tune to the Austrian folk song “ Wie Böhmen noch bei Öst'rreich war” and first verse of the 1890s folk song "Shortnin' Bread."

Lyrics
One version of the lyrics, published in the 2015 collection No More Monkeys, runs:

Variations
Alternate versions of the song changes the last monkey's reference to "she" or "one". An additional verse on the last verse following the last monkey going down include lines such as:

Gestures
The song can be performed with to accompany to each verse are, such as:

Hold up a number of fingers equal to the number of monkeys and bounce them onto the palm of the other hand;
Hold head;
Put your pinky finger to your cheek and thumb to your ear (as if using a telephone);
Wag your index finger

Influence
Eileen Christelow has written a series of books titled "Five Little Monkeys  ..". She acknowledges that she did not write the original lyrics, she heard it from her daughter.

See also
 Ten Little Indians

References 

Children's games
English children's songs
American folk songs
Children's poetry
Early childhood education
Finger plays
Fictional monkeys
Fictional quintets
English nursery rhymes
Year of song unknown
Songwriter unknown